Was This Man a Genius?: Talks with Andy Kaufman is a 2001 non-fiction work by American author Julie Hecht. It was first published on April 17, 2001 through Random House and was republished in paperback through Simon & Schuster in 2009. The book is based on a book-length profile that Hecht had written, which was based on conversations that Hecht had held with comedian Andy Kaufman during 1978 and 1979.

Synopsis
In 1978 Hecht was asked to interview Kaufman for a profile that was to be published in Harper's Magazine. For the following year she met several times with Kaufman, during which time he performed several pranks and acts in an attempt to unnerve Hecht. Despite this, Hecht continued in her attempts and was ultimately rewarded with a genuine interview, which she drafted into a profile that Harper's Magazine did not publish.

Reception
Critical reception for Was This Man a Genius? was mixed. Publishers Weekly panned the work overall, stating "coming so far behind Zmuda's Andy Kaufman Revealed and Bill Zehme's Lost in the Funhouse, and containing little new information, the publication of this tedious biography seems almost as puzzling as the performer himself." Kirkus Reviews and the New York Times were more positive in their reviews, and the New York Times wrote that "in its relentlessly, unapologetically obsessive-compulsive author, Kaufman may have met his match."

References

2001 non-fiction books
American non-fiction books
Random House books
Andy Kaufman
Books of interviews